Georgiyevka is a rural locality (a selo) in Korolinsky Selsoviet of Oktyabrsky District, Amur Oblast, Russia. The population was 38 as of 2018. There is 1 street.

Geography 
Georgiyevka is located 21 km north of Yekaterinoslavka (the district's administrative centre) by road. Koroli is the nearest rural locality.

References 

Rural localities in Oktyabrsky District, Amur Oblast